The calefactory (also warming house) was an important room or building in a medieval monastery in Western Europe. It was here that a communal fire was kept so that the monks could warm themselves after long hours of study in the (unheated) cloister or other work. In the early Middle Ages this was one of the few heated rooms in the monastery – the others being the infirmary, the guest house and the kitchen – but this policy was generally relaxed, save for a few very strict orders, by the latter part of the medieval period when fireplaces became common throughout the claustral buildings.

The warming house was always one of the buildings surrounding the cloister and was entered from it. Often it was located close to the refectory so that the warmth could be shared by the monks when they were eating. In many monasteries an upper floor was built over the warming house that served as the muniment room, where the house's charters, deeds and other legal documents were kept safe from damp.

References

Citations

Works cited 

 
 

Christian monastic architecture
Rooms